Castell Vaughn Bryant was the interim president of Florida A&M University between January 2005 and May 2007. She is the first woman to hold this position at the university.

The Board of Trustees, upon her appointment, voted that Bryant would not be eligible to apply for or hold the permanent post of President of the university. R. B. Holmes, Co-chairman of the Presidential Search Committee, announced that he'd had hoped that a new permanent president would be appointed by the end of 2006.  Bryant resigned from her position as interim President of FAMU on Friday May 11, 2007.  Larry Robinson served briefly as the university's Chief Operating Officer, until newly appointed President James H. Ammons assumed the post on July 2, 2007.

References

External links
Florida Department of Education appointment

Living people
Presidents of Florida A&M University
1948 births